Anaiis (stylized anaiis) is a French-Senegalese singer-songwriter.

Biography 
Anaiis was born in Toulouse, France. While growing up, her family frequently moved from city to city, including Dublin, Dakar, Oakland, Salvador de Bahia, and London, where she would eventually relocate and settle. She attended NYU's Tisch School of the Arts.

In 2018, she released Before Zero, her debut EP. The following year, she released Darkness at Play, produced by Om'Mas Keith. She would go on to release a number of singles from 2019 to 2021, including "Vanishing", which she performed on A COLORS Show. In September 2021, she released her debut album This Is No Longer a Dream via Dream Sequence Recordings.

Discography 
Studio albums
 Darkness at Play (2019)
 This Is No Longer a Dream (2021)

EPs
 Before Zero (2018)

Singles
 "Nina" (2018)
 "No Control" (2018)
 "Lost My Faith" (2019)
 "Learn to Love" (2020)
 "Vanishing" (A COLORS Show) (2020)
 "Juno" (2021)
 "Reverie" (2021)
 "Chuu" (featuring Topaz Jones) (2021)
 "Cry in Your Sleep" (featuring Chronixx) (2021)

References 

French singer-songwriters
21st-century Senegalese women singers